Marie's Crisis Cafe is a piano bar and gay bar located at 59 Grove Street in the West Village of New York City. Constructed on the site of Thomas Paine's home, the location originally served as a brothel before gradually transitioning to a bar. By the early 1970s, the bar had become an established presence in the West Village for the nascent gay community and, over time, also became a popular piano bar. Today, the bar is known for its boisterous sing-along culture and popularity among Broadway industry participants and fans.

History
The bar occupies the same location as Thomas Paine's former residence and the location where he died. The building currently occupied by the bar was constructed in 1838 and originally served as a brothel and boarding house. By the 1890s, the establishment had become an early gay bar (referred to at the time as a "boy bar"). In 1929, the bar was acquired by Marie DuMont and renamed "Marie's".

At some point in the mid-20th century, the bar acquired a Works Progress Administration glass etching of the American and French revolutions that now sits behind the bar.  In 1972, the Grant family acquired the bar and added the word "Crisis" to the bar's name in an acknowledgment to Thomas Paine's The American Crisis.

Current operations
Today, the bar is a notable gay bar and sing-along piano bar. The bar is particularly popular with fans of Broadway musicals and industry professionals.

In media
Marie's Crisis has been featured in several television programs including The Politician, High Maintenance, and Younger. The cafe also appears in the 1950 film noir Side Street.

See also

 List of dive bars

References

External links

Musical theatre
Dive bars in New York (state)
West Village
LGBT nightclubs in New York (state)
LGBT drinking establishments in New York City